Classic Example was an American contemporary R&B group that was active in the early 1990s. The group consisted of Darin Campbell, Gerald Alston, Jami Thomson, Marvin Harris and Robert Rose.

The group's only charting single was their debut single "It's Alright", which peaked at #68 on the Billboard Hot 100 in 1992. The single appeared on the soundtrack to the film South Central as well as on the group's eponymous debut album, but neither album charted in the United States.

Discography

Albums
 Classic Example (1992)

Singles

References

External links
 

African-American musical groups
American contemporary R&B musical groups
Hollywood Records artists